Harman is an unincorporated community in Buchanan County, in the U.S. state of Virginia.

The Harman post office was established in 1935. It was named for the Harman family who owned the local coal mine.

References

Unincorporated communities in Virginia
Unincorporated communities in Buchanan County, Virginia